Derrick Smith may refer to:

 Derrick Smith (ice hockey) (born 1965), Canadian NHL centre
 Derrick Smith (soccer) (born 1991), US Virgin Islands international soccer player
 Derrick Smith (politician), American politician from Illinois
 Derrick C. Smith (born 1943), Jamaican politician

See also
 Derek Smith (disambiguation)